The 2014 Patriot League baseball tournament took place on consecutive weekends, with the semifinals held May 10–11 and the finals May 17–18.  The higher seeded teams each hosted best of three series.   won their sixth Tournament championship and earned the conference's automatic bid to the 2014 NCAA Division I baseball tournament.

Seeding
The top four finishers from the regular season were seeded one through four, with the top seed hosting the fourth seed and second seed hosting the third.  The visiting team was designated as the home team in the second game of each series.  Top seeded Bucknell hosted fourth seeded Navy, while second seeded Army hosted third seeded Lehigh in the opening round.  Bucknell claimed the top seed by tiebreaker over Army.

Results

Semifinals

Bucknell vs. Navy

Army vs. Lehigh

Final

All-Tournament Team
The following players were named to the All-Tournament Team.

Most Valuable Player
Joe Ogren was named Tournament Most Valuable Player.  Ogren was an outfielder for Bucknell.

References

2014 Patriot League baseball season
Patriot League Baseball Tournament
Pat
Patriot League baseball tournament